Hilda Sofie Kindt (1 December 1881 – 5 October 1966) was a Norwegian civil servant and politician for the Conservative Party.

She was born in Trondhjem as a daughter of physician Olaf Berg Kindt (1850–1935) and Henriette Augusta Trampe (1854–1929). Her brother Kristian Sommer Kindt became a chief physician, her sister Anna Karoline married Lieutenant Colonel Jørgen Theodor Tandberg. She finished middle school in 1897 and a trade course in 1899. She was hired at the tax office in Trondhjem in 1908, and was the chief bookkeeper from 1923 to 1942.

She was a member of Trondhjem city council from 1919 to 1925. She was elected as a deputy representative to the Parliament of Norway from the Market towns of Sør-Trøndelag and Nord-Trøndelag counties in 1924, and served through one term, meeting in parliamentary sessions in 1925 and 1927.

She died in October 1966 and was buried at Lade.

References

1881 births
1966 deaths
Norwegian civil servants
Norwegian bankers
Conservative Party (Norway) politicians
Deputy members of the Storting
Politicians from Trondheim
Women members of the Storting
20th-century Norwegian businesswomen
20th-century Norwegian businesspeople
Women bankers
20th-century Norwegian women politicians
20th-century Norwegian politicians
Place of death missing